This is a list of French Academy Award winners and nominees.  This list details the performances of French actors, actresses, and films that have either been submitted or nominated for, or have won, an Academy Award (The Oscars). This list is current as of the 94th Academy Awards ceremony held on March 27, 2022.

Best Actor

Leading

Supporting

Best Actress

Leading

Supporting

Best Animated Feature
This list focuses on French-born directors and producers.

Best Production Design
This list focuses on French-born art directors and set decorators.

Best Cinematography
This list focuses on French-born cinematographers.

Best Costume Design
This list focuses on French-born costume designers.

Best Makeup and Hairstyling 
This list focuses on French-born makeup artist.

Best Director

Best Documentary Feature
This list focuses on French-born producers/directors.

Best Editing
This list focuses on French-born film editors.

Best Picture
This list focuses on French-born producers.

Best International Feature Film

Best Music
This list focuses on scores or songs created by French-born composers.

Original Score

Original Song

Best Short Film

Live Action

Animated

Documentary

Best Sound

Best Visual Effects

Best Writing
This list focuses on French-born writers.

Adapted Screenplay

Original Screenplay

Story

Honorary Awards
This list focuses on French-born recipients of the Honorary Award

Nominations and Winners

See also

 Cinema of France
 List of British Academy Award nominees and winners

References

Academy Awards
Lists of Academy Award winners and nominees by nationality or region
Academy Award winners
Academy Awards